The Oberliga Süd was the southernmost of the five Oberligen, the regional leagues forming the top level of association football in West Germany from 1945 until the formation of the Bundesliga in 1963. Oberliga Süd covered the southern three German states of Bavaria, Baden-Württemberg and Hesse.

Overview

The league was introduced as the highest level of football in the US occupation zone in 1945 to replace the disbanded Gauligen. It played its first round on 4 November 1945 and continued on throughout winter. No less than 16 clubs were elected into the new league, a novelty in German football and quite an achievement in the early post-war conditions. At this stage, clubs from the south-western parts of Baden and Württemberg were not eligible to compete in it as they were based in the French occupation zone and had to play in the Oberliga Südwest (Südgruppe), where they remained until 1950, when the separation of South and Southwest was made final. Play in the southern parts of Germany went underway almost straight after the end of the war while the north and east still had to wait some more years. One reason for this was the fact that the less industrial, more agricultural south had sustained much less damage to infrastructure. But there was another specific advantage. The authorities in the U.S. zone encouraged the relaunch of competitive sports on a regional basis much earlier than this happened in the other zones. Regional (or nationwide) football associations were not tolerated anywhere before 1948. The Oberliga Süd, however, was licensed to a group of private persons, thus being a sort of "independent" league during its first five seasons. It did not join the South German F.A. until 1950.

The clubs in the Oberliga Süd had been in the following Gauligen:
 Gauliga Baden (without the clubs from the southern half)
 Gauliga Bayern
 Gauliga Kurhessen
 Gauliga Hessen-Nassau
 Gauliga Württemberg

In addition to the Oberliga Süd, four other Oberligas were formed in Germany in the 1940s.

Oberliga West (formed in 1947)
Oberliga Nord (formed in 1947)
Oberliga Berlin (formed in 1945, originally with clubs from West and East Berlin)
Oberliga Südwest (formed in 1945)

Set below the Oberliga were originally the Landesligas of Hessen, Bayern, Württemberg and Nordbaden, from 1950 also Südbaden. From 1950 the 2. Oberliga Süd was formed as an intermediate between Oberliga and Landesligas.

With the reintroduction of the German championship in 1948, the winner and runners-up of the Oberliga Süd went on to the finals tournament with the other Oberliga champions. In 16 attempts the Oberliga Süd managed to win it six times.

In 1950, the southern group of the Oberliga Südwest was disbanded and its clubs joined the Southern German Football Association. The SSV Reutlingen and the FC Singen 04 joined the Oberliga Süd, SV Tübingen, Freiburger FC and Vfl Konstanz were integrated into the new 2nd Oberliga Süd and the other eleven clubs were relegated to the Amateurliga.

The Oberliga Süd had quite a few permanent clubs. The VfB Stuttgart, 1. FC Nürnberg, Eintracht Frankfurt, Kickers Offenbach, VfR Mannheim and 1. FC Schweinfurt 05 played all of the 18 possible seasons in the league. The Karlsruher SC was also present for all 18 seasons but only by counting in both halves of the merger club.

Founding members of the Oberliga Süd
In order of finish:

VfB Stuttgart
1. FC Nürnberg
Stuttgarter Kickers
TSV Schwaben Augsburg
SV Waldhof Mannheim
FC Bayern Munich
FC Schweinfurt 05
BC Augsburg
TSV 1860 Munich
FSV Frankfurt
Eintracht Frankfurt
Kickers Offenbach
SpVgg Fürth
VfR Mannheim
Phönix Karlsruhe
Karlsruher FV

Of those clubs, the Karlsruher FV was reformed and the Phönix Karlsruhe is now the Karlsruher SC.

Disbanding of the Oberliga
With the introduction of the Bundesliga, five teams from the Oberliga Süd were admitted to the new Bundesliga. The remaining clubs went to the new Regionalliga Süd, one of five new second divisions.

The teams admitted to the Bundesliga were:

TSV 1860 Munich (Champion Oberliga Süd 1963)
1. FC Nürnberg (Runners-up Oberliga Süd 1963)
Eintracht Frankfurt (4th placed Oberliga Süd 1963)
Karlsruher SC (5th placed Oberliga Süd 1963)
VfB Stuttgart (6th placed Oberliga Süd 1963)

The 3rd placed team of the 1963 season, the FC Bayern Munich was not admitted as the German Football Association did not want two teams from the same city in the league and TSV 1860 Munich had qualified in a higher position.

The following teams from the Oberliga went to the new Regionalliga:

FC Bayern Munich
Kickers Offenbach
TSG Ulm 1846
SpVgg Fürth
Hessen Kassel
1. FC Schweinfurt 05
VfR Mannheim
FC Bayern Hof
SSV Reutlingen
TSV Schwaben Augsburg
BC Augsburg

Qualifying for the Bundesliga
The qualifying system for the new league was fairly complex. The league placings of the clubs playing in the Oberligen for the last ten seasons were taken into consideration, whereby results from 1952 to 1955 counted once, results from 1955 to 1959 counted double and results from 1959 to 1963 triple. A first-place finish was awarded 16 points, a sixteenth place one point. Appearances in the German championship or DFB-Pokal finals were also rewarded with points. The five Oberliga champions of the 1962–63 season were granted direct access to the Bundesliga. All up, 46 clubs applied for the 16 available Bundesliga slots.

Following this system, by 11 January 1963, the DFB announced nine fixed clubs for the new league and reduced the clubs eligible for the remaining seven places to 20. Clubs within the same Oberliga that were separated by less than 50 points were considered on equal rank and the 1962-63 placing was used to determine the qualified team.

Of the thirteen clubs from this league applying, the 1. FC Nürnberg and Eintracht Frankfurt qualified early. Karlsruher SC and VfB Stuttgart held third and fourth place in the overall points ranking. Kickers Offenbach and FC Bayern Munich missed out to TSV 1860 Munich due to the latter winning the league in 1962–63 even though 1860 were 153 points behind Offenbach and 59 behind FC Bayern.

Points table:

 
 1 Denotes club was one of the nine selected on 11 January 1963.
 2 Denotes club was one of the 20 taken into final selection.
 3 Denotes club was one of the 15 applicants which were removed from final selection.

Honours
The winners and runners-up of the Oberliga Süd:

 Bold denotes team went on to win German Championship.

Placings & all-time table of the Oberliga Süd
The final placings and all-time table of the Oberliga Süd:

VfB Mühlburg and Phönix Karlsruhe merged in 1952 to form Karlsruher SC.
* denotes club played in the Oberliga Südwest until 1950.

Top scorers
The league's top scorers:

References

Sources
 Kicker Almanach,  The yearbook on German football from Bundesliga to Oberliga, since 1937, published by the Kicker Sports Magazine
 Süddeutschlands Fussballgeschichte in Tabellenform 1897-1988  History of Southern German football in tables, publisher & author: Ludolf Hyll
 100 Jahre Süddeutscher Fussball-Verband  100-year-anniversary book of Southern German football Association, publisher: Vindelica Verlag, published: 1997
 Die Deutsche Liga-Chronik 1945-2005  History of German football from 1945 to 2005 in tables, publisher: DSFS, published: 2006

External links
 Das deutsche Fussball Archiv  Historic German league tables
 Oberliga Süd at Fussballdaten.de

Sud
Football competitions in Baden-Württemberg
1
Football competitions in Hesse
1945 establishments in Germany
1963 disestablishments in Germany
Sports leagues established in 1945
Ger